Albert Dubout (15 May 1905 – 27 June 1976) was a French cartoonist, illustrator, painter, and sculptor.

Biography

Albert Dubout was born in Marseille. After attending school at Nîmes (where he met Jean Paulhan) he studied at the fine arts school in Montpellier where he met his first wife, Renée Altier, and where his first drawings were published in the student journal  in 1923.

After moving to Paris, literary director Philippe Soupault was the first to hire him to illustrate a book,  by Nicolas Boileau-Despréaux. Dubout continued on to illustrate numerous editions of books by Boileau, Beaumarchais, Mérimée, Rabelais, Villon, Cervantes, Balzac, Racine, Voltaire, Rostand, Poe, and Courteline.

He collaborated on numerous magazines and journals such as Le Rire, Marianne, Eclats de Rire, L'os à Moëlle, Paris-Soir, and Ici-Paris.

He also created movie and theatre posters as well as theatrical sets. He worked in advertising, painted oil canvases (over 70 in total) and illustrated many book covers and record sleeves.

Albert Dubout also illustrated Gargantua and Pantagruel, oeuvres of the famous French satirist Rabelais. One of his favorite and perhaps unwilling models were an obese tobacconist and the small and scrawny tax collector who lived in the forties and fifties in Agde, Herault, France.

In 1953, French president Vincent Auriol awarded him the Legion of Honour. His name also appeared that year in the Petit Larousse dictionary.

In 1965, he illustrated the San-Antonio book series, at the request of author Frédéric Dard.

In 1967 he married his second wife, Suzanne Ballivet, who was also a painter. He divided his time in this period between Mézy-sur-Seine, near Paris, and Palavas-les-Flots, on the south coast, until his death in 1976.

In 1992, a museum about Dubout was dedicated in Palavas-les-Flots.

Anecdotes
 In his caricatures, Dubout frequently mocked the "little train of Palavas", which ran from nearby Montpellier, and the tourists who visited his little seaside town from there.

Bibliography
 Dubout. Carton, les cahiers du dessin d'humour. 1975.

External links
 official site
 Albert Dubout in HeidICON Illustrations of 'Der Simpl'
 Lambiek Comiclopedia article about Albert Dubout.

1905 births
1976 deaths
French cartoonists
French caricaturists
French comics artists
20th-century French painters
20th-century French male artists
French male painters
Artists from Marseille
20th-century French sculptors
French male sculptors